This article is a list of episodes from the television show Eagle Riders in order by production number. Only 13 out of order episodes were broadcast in the United States. The first 3 episodes were credited to writer R.D. Smithee.

Episode list
<onlyinclude>

In Eagle Riders' run in America, only a select 13 of the 65 episodes were aired, with a few of them having been picked from later in the series. 
Eagle Riders was also one of the first series broadcast on the UK's version of Fox Kids, although the entire series was never shown, stopping at episode 47 (coincidentally the last episode featuring Gatchaman II material).
The episodes excluded from Gatchaman II in the adaptation include: 6, 16, 17, 28, and 35. Episodes 3, 4, 8-11, 13, 14, 16–19, 21–24, 26, 27, 29, 34, 38–39, and 41-48 of Gatchaman Fighter were also untranslated, though footage from the finale made it into the opening sequence and as stock footage in one episode.
When Eagle Riders began adapting Gatchaman Fighter, Saban cut and merged parts of episodes into single stories, along with merging the finale of Gatchaman II with the premiere of Fighter.

References

Further reading 
 G-Force: Animated

Gatchaman episodes
Lists of American children's animated television series episodes
Lists of Australian animated television series episodes
Lists of science fiction television series episodes
Lists of anime episodes